Mauricio Martínez (born 20 February 1993), nicknamed Caramelo, is an Argentine professional footballer who plays for the Argentine club Racing Club as a defensive midfielder or centre-back.

Club career
Born in Santo Tomé, Argentina, a town inside of Santa Fe, he grew in the local football (Independiente de Santo Tome) club until 2010, when he joined Unión de Santa Fe's youth club and, from 2013 to 2016, its senior club. In July 2016 he joined Rosario Central. In 2018, he joined Racing Club.

International career
He represented Argentina in the football competition at the 2016 Summer Olympics.

International goals

References

External links

Argentine footballers
1993 births
Living people
People from La Capital Department, Santa Fe
Sportspeople from Santa Fe Province
Argentine Primera División players
Unión de Santa Fe footballers
Rosario Central footballers
Racing Club de Avellaneda footballers
L.D.U. Quito footballers
Footballers at the 2016 Summer Olympics
Olympic footballers of Argentina
Association football midfielders
Association football defenders